Robert A. Baffert (born January 13, 1953) is an American racehorse trainer who trained the 2015 Triple Crown winner American Pharoah and 2018 Triple Crown winner Justify. Baffert's horses have won a record six Kentucky Derbies, seven Preakness Stakes, three Belmont Stakes, and three Kentucky Oaks.

Early life and career
Baffert grew up on a ranch in Nogales, Arizona, where his family raised cattle and chickens. When he was 10, his father purchased some Quarter Horses and he practiced racing them on a dirt track. In his teens, he worked as a jockey for $100 a day in informal Quarter Horse races on the outskirts of Nogales. From there, he moved to racing at recognized tracks, scoring his first victory at age 17 in 1970.

Baffert graduated from the University of Arizona's Race Track Industry Program with a Bachelor of Science degree, got married, and began training quarter horses at a Prescott, Arizona farm. By age 20, he had developed a reputation as a trainer and was hired by other trainers to run their stables. His first winner was Flipper Star at Rillito Park on January 28, 1979. In the 1980s, Baffert moved to California and worked at Los Alamitos Race Course, where he switched to training Thoroughbreds full-time in 1991. He got his first big break in 1992 when he won his first Breeder's Cup race with Thirty Slews.

Baffert established his early reputation with less expensive horses like Silver Charm and Real Quiet, bought for $16,500 and $17,000 respectively. Fellow trainer D. Wayne Lukas attributed Baffert's success to his "extraordinary eye for a good horse" and his management ability in finding the right opportunities for his charges.

American classic history
Baffert's history in the American classic races began in 1996 when he trained a three-year-old colt named Cavonnier, who ran second in the Kentucky Derby. In 1997, he trained Silver Charm to win the Kentucky Derby and Preakness Stakes, finishing second in the Belmont. Baffert revisited the Derby the next year, sending two top colts, Real Quiet and Indian Charlie, to Louisville. Real Quiet won the race that year, and Baffert also finished third with Indian Charlie. Real Quiet won the Preakness as well, but, like Silver Charm, the horse was denied a Triple Crown win and finished second in the Belmont Stakes by a nose. Baffert, however, became the first trainer in history to win the Derby and Preakness in back-to-back years.

Baffert did not win another classic race until 2001, when he won the Preakness and Belmont Stakes with eventual Hall of Fame member Point Given. He finished third in the Derby that year with Congaree. Baffert won the Derby a third time in 2002 with War Emblem. The colt went on to win the Preakness Stakes, giving the trainer his third shot at winning the Triple Crown. The colt lost the Belmont Stakes after breaking poorly from the starting gate. Baffert did not have a horse hit the board again in any of the Triple Crown races until 2009, when he trained Pioneerof The Nile to a second-place finish in the Derby.

Baffert trained Lookin At Lucky, co-owned by Mike Pegram, to win the Preakness Stakes in 2010. The colt skipped the Belmont Stakes but became the champion three-year-old colt that year. In 2012, Baffert saddled Bodemeister, named for the trainer's youngest son, Bode, to second-place finishes in the Derby and Preakness. He saddled Paynter in the Belmont Stakes later that year, but that colt, like his stablemate Bodemeister, finished second.

In 2015, Baffert trained the 2014 champion two-year-old colt American Pharoah to win the Triple Crown, the first to do so in 37 years. In winning the 141st Kentucky Derby, bringing his total number of victories in the race to four; Baffert also ran the third-place finisher, the previously undefeated colt Dortmund. American Pharoah next won the 140th Preakness Stakes, making six victories in that race for Baffert, who also finished fourth with Dortmund. Then, when American Pharoah won the 2015 Belmont Stakes, the win was the fourth attempt at a Triple Crown for Baffert, who at age 62 became the second-oldest trainer to win a Triple Crown.

Baffert also trained the 2018 Triple Crown Winner, Justify and the 2020 Kentucky Derby winner, Authentic. Baffert became a 7-time winner of the Kentucky Derby in 2021 with Medina Spirit. However, Medina Spirit tested positive for the steroid betamethasone.  the question of whether the horse would join Dancer's Image by being disqualified for a drug violation in the Derby remains pending. Medina Spirit died after a training session on 6 December 2021 and an ensuing necropsy on 11 February 2022 was inconclusive.

Accomplishments
Between 1997 and 1999, he won the Eclipse Award as outstanding trainer three years running and was voted the 1997 Big Sport of Turfdom Award. Baffert was inducted into Lone Star Park's Hall of Fame in 2007, and in 2009, he was nominated and inducted to the National Museum of Racing's Hall of Fame, the same year as a filly he trained, Silverbulletday. Point Given was nominated in 2009, but elected and inducted in 2010.

Baffert has trained horses that won fifteen American Classic Races, fifteen Breeders' Cup races, four Dubai World Cups and the inaugural Pegasus World Cup. His graded stakes wins include nine wins in the Santa Anita Derby, nine in the Haskell Invitational Handicap, and fourteen in the Del Mar Futurity, a race he won seven straight times from 1996 to 2002, when it was a Grade II event. He also won the race in 2008, 2009, 2011, 2012, 2014, 2016, and 2018 when run as a Grade I event. He has won the Kentucky Oaks three times: first in 1999 with Silverbulletday, who was later selected for the Hall of Fame, then with Plum Pretty in 2011 and with Abel Tasman in 2017.

In 2010, Misremembered, a horse he bred, owned by his wife Jill and their friend George Jacobs, won the Santa Anita Handicap, marking Baffert's first Grade I win as a breeder instead of a trainer.

Controversies 
According to his supporters, Baffert's style and personality, combined with his success, have made him a target for controversy. Longtime client Mike Pegram explained,  "Anybody who walks with that swagger, people are going to love him or hate him…he's a wiseass and irreverent." Former client Kaleem Shah said, "He will rub people the wrong way by speaking his mind, sometimes he needs to hit the mute button." 

However, over 30 horses Baffert trained have failed drug tests. Baffert has paid out over $20,000 in fines, but compared against over $321 million in career earnings. He routinely challenges most sanctions, usually agreeing to accept fines but vigorously fighting suspensions. Horse owner and racing reform advocate Barry Irwin has stated, "He's Mr. Teflon."

In raw numbers, most of Baffert's medication violations were for exceeding allowed amounts of authorized medications such as phenylbutazone, a pain medication commonly administered to horses. However, his violations for use of prohibited  medications has sparked controversy.

In 2021, the post-race test of Kentucky Derby winner Medina Spirit showed 21pg/mL of betamethasone. In Kentucky, any amount of betamethasone detected in post-race testing is a violation and could result in a disqualification.  It was Baffert's fifth violation in 13 months.

At a news conference on May 9, Baffert initially said that Medina Spirit was never administered betamethasone. He told reporters that he would fight the issue "...tooth and nail." Nonetheless, Churchill Downs suspended Baffert from entering any horses at their racetrack pending the outcome of an investigation.  Baffert responded by saying the situation "was like a cancel culture kind of a thing," a remark which earned him noticeable criticism from the press. On May 11, Baffert stated Medina Spirit had dermatitis, for which an ointment containing betamethasone was used. Sports Illustrated suggested that the positive drug test was a sign that Baffert's "leaking credibility" had reached "the saturation point."  On June 2, 2021, Medina Spirit's split sample also tested positive and Churchill Downs suspended Baffert through the end of the 2023 Spring Meet.

On May 17, 2021, the New York Racing Association (NYRA) banned Baffert from entering Medina Spirit or any of his other horses in the 2021 Belmont Stakes or any other race at Belmont Park.  On June 14, 2021, Baffert sued the NYRA alleging the association had no authority to suspend his license and that suspension "without prior notice" was a violation of the law.  On July 14 the suspension was reversed by U. S. Federal District Court Judge Carol Bagley Amon sitting in the Eastern District of New York in Brooklyn.  The Judge made her ruling based on the NYRA having not allowed Baffert a forum to refute their claims and stated that (they the NYRA).."had held no hearing — let alone a prompt one." On September 10, 2021 Baffert was charged by NYRA for conduct detrimental to the best interests of racing. Additional charges were added on January 3, 2022.

In February 2022, Baffert was suspended 90 days and fined $7,500 by the Kentucky Horse Racing Commission. The suspension was scheduled to run March 8 through June 5. Baffert was granted a stay until April 4 to gain time for an appeal.  However, the Kentucky Court of Appeals rejected Baffert's appeal on April 1.  This in turn led to a ban from all California Horse Racing Board facilities beginning April 4 due to a rule removing any trainer under a 60 day or higher ban from all CHRB facilities. This included Baffert's home track at Santa Anita, although Baffert horse Shaaz won the sixth race on April 2.  The 90 day ban against Baffert was set to be honored in all 38 racing states.  By the April 1 ruling, Baffert had already transferred four 3-year-old colts to other trainers.

The most notable cases prior to Medina Spirit's test was the disqualification of Gamine after a third place finish in the 2020 Kentucky Oaks, also for betamethasone, and Triple Crown winner Justify, who tested positive for scopolamine after winning the 2018 Santa Anita Derby, but the results did not become public until after the horse won the Triple Crown. That case was eventually dismissed as the regulators concluded the facts supported an instance of feed contamination. Similarly, cases against two horses who tested positive in Arkansas in 2020 for lidocaine were dismissed as being the result of accidental transfer from an assistant trainer who was using the medication on himself. Nonetheless, in that case, Arkansas suspended Baffert for 15 days. His first suspension was in 1977 for misuse of morphene, but thereafter he had no violations for the next eight years.

Controversy deepened when on December 6, 2021, Medina Spirit died of an apparent heart attack after a workout at Santa Anita Park. This reminded the public that since 2000, at least 74 other horses had died while in Baffert's stables.  Though number of racing starts are used to calculate rates of death for all horses in the care of race trainers, not all horse deaths were animals in race training nor were they necessarily race-related fatalities.

Prior to Medina Spirit's death, Baffert had last been under intense scrutiny a decade earlier when seven horses in his stables at Hollywood Park died between November 2, 2011 and March 14, 2013, all from sudden and later unexplained heart attacks. In that period, 36% of all cardiac related horse deaths in California were animals trained by Baffert. California's equine medical director found that Baffert's horses were routinely given Thyro-L, or thyroxine, a thyroid hormone, that could cause heart problems during exercise, but concluded the medication, which Baffert said he had been using routinely for the previous five years, did not cause the heart attacks. No sanctions were issued against Baffert.

Personal life
Baffert has been married twice and has five children: four with his first wife, Sherry: Taylor, Canyon, Forest, and Savannah. He married his second wife, Jill, a former television reporter based in Louisville, in 2002. They had a son in 2004 whom they named "Bode", after skier Bode Miller. Baffert and his family reside in California.

He appeared in an episode of the TV show Take Home Chef.

Bob survived a heart attack in late March 2012 while in Dubai for a world-class race at Meydan.

Following the 2015 Belmont win, Baffert outlined several charities that he and his wife Jill supported. He had been paid $200,000 to allow the Burger King to stand behind him in the grandstand during the televised broadcast of the Belmont, after having turned down $150,000 to allow the mascot to appear with him at the Preakness.  At the post-Belmont press conference, Baffert  announced he and his wife would be making donations of $50,000 each to the Thoroughbred Aftercare Alliance, the California Retirement Management Account (CARMA), and Old Friends Equine, all programs for retired race horses; and to the Permanently Disabled Jockey's Fund in memory of a Quarter Horse Jockey named Robert Z. "Bobby" Adair. A friend of Baffert's and an inductee into the American Quarter Horse Association Hall of Fame, Adair died on Preakness Day, May 16, 2015, at 71. Baffert dedicated American Pharoah's win to Bobby.

Triple Crown race record

Kentucky Derby record: 34–7–3–3

Preakness record: 23–7–2–3

Belmont record: 12–3–3–0
 ✝ – won Triple Crown.
 ‡ – Filly
 * – win stripped

References

External links
 

1953 births
American horse trainers
Eclipse Award winners
Horse racing controversies
Living people
People from Nogales, Arizona
United States Thoroughbred Racing Hall of Fame inductees
University of Arizona alumni